"Ekbar biday de Ma ghure ashi" ("Bid me goodbye Mother") is a Bengali patriotic song written by Pitambar Das. This song was composed in honour of Khudiram Bose.
This song is still very popular in West Bengal (India), Khudiram Bose is highly revered as a hero in India particularly West Bengal.

Background
Khudiram Bose was the first Bengali rebel hanged by the British Government during the Indian National Movement. Khudiram took part in armed revolution against the British Raj, was sentenced to death, and hanged on 11 August 1908. At that time he was only 18 years old. The song was written on the occasion of Khudiram's death. It was celebrated as a farewell song by Khudiram. Entire Bengali nation shed tears over this song.

Theme
The song was written when young Khudiram was hanged to death. In the song, (in first person narrative), Khudiram is asking his mother to bid him goodbye (since he is going to die). The song goes on– "Let me wear the noose round my neck with pleasure. I'll come back in due time. Let the world be witness."Lyrics

References

Indian patriotic songs
Bengali folklore
Bengali culture
Bengali-language songs
Year of song missing
Lata Mangeshkar songs

External links 
 Ekbar Biday De Ma Ghure Asi'' on YouTube